Pilar, officially the Municipality of Pilar (Capiznon/Hiligaynon: Banwa sang Pilar), is a 3rd class municipality in the province of Capiz, Philippines. According to the 2020 census, it has a population of 47,100 people.

History

The coastal town sprang out from an Austronesian settlement in the early 16th century when indio natives managed to escape oppression from Spanish colonial authorities. The settlement was then known as Sibala, named after the river that ran through the coastal village. In 1570, however, the settlement was seized by Spanish forces and the guardia civil took full control of the village fortifying it with a military garrison. It later flourished into a bigger town and was renamed after its designated patron La Nuestra Señora del Pilar (Our Lady of the Pillar). In the 18th century, it adopted the (Holy Trinity) La Santisima Trinidad as its municipal patron after a wooden image of the Holy Trinity from the wreckage of a Spanish galleon ship en route from Mexico was found in the town's coastline. Augustinian friars were initially assigned to preach in the town since then until it would later receive its permanent parish priest and Roman Catholic Church.

In 1897, there had been an armed insurgency known as the Battle of Balisong during the Philippine Revolution in an attempt to overthrow Spanish authorities in the municipality led by local revolutionaries with the support of other resistance groups in Capiz, namely from the neighboring towns of Pan-ay and Pontevedra.

In 1949, the sitios and barrios of Aranguel, Culilang, Pandan, Pinamihagan, Cadoulan, Quiajo, Sangcal, Pondol, Marita, Madulano, Jabuyana, Bo-ac, Cabugcabug, Goce Badiangon, Bayuyan, Agbobolo, Cubay, Ibaca, and the sitio of Lotudlotud, which was converted into a barrio of Elizalde, were separated from the municipal jurisdiction of Pilar to form a separate town, namely President Roxas, by virtue of Republic Act No. 374.

Geography

Barangays
Pilar is politically subdivided into 24 barangays.

Climate

Demographics

Most of the town's population are made up by Austronesian descendants, such as Capiznon and Hiligaynon, followed by Aetas and a few of Chinese and Spanish ancestry.

Economy 

Pilar has an income classification of third class. Development in basic infrastructure has been stagnant during the last decades. Annual income is low and poverty rates are said to be high, although the town has also seen greater years. The rural municipality is said to be rich in natural resources such as aquatic and mineral wealth. It used to be a strong seafood producer in the province and once even possessed its own sugar and mining industry.

Major agricultural produce of the town include fish, prawn, crab, rice, sugar, cattle and poultry. Other notable industries include shell craft and wood furniture.

Culture

Roman Catholicism combined with indigenous superstitious traditions have a strong imprint on the town's local culture.

An iconic 12-foot landmark of the Virgin Mary is visible at a mountaintop in Barangay Dulangan, built by an affluent Filipino-Chinese businessman from Roxas City. A chapel facing the figurine has been erected where occasional thanksgiving masses are held during special occasions.

The town celebrates its annual feast along with the coming of the sacred Santisima Trinidad (The Holy Trinity), an early 18th-century wooden figurine from Mexico found by local fishermen in the shores of the town during the British invasion of the Philippines in 1762. The figurine is believed to have been brought over by a galleon trading ship from the port of Acapulco, Mexico, but destroyed by British warships on its route to Luzon and was washed off to the coast of Pilar. It is on display in the altar of the town's church, the Parish of the Most Holy Trinity.

The town also has its own Baptist church, Iglesia Filipina Independiente and Iglesia ni Kristo Parish. The barangays of Dulangan and Casanayan are known to be satellite villages of the municipality.

The town is also known for its rich heritage oral folklore and supernatural practices. The Legend of the Golden Ship, a trading ship owned by deities that docks on the town's coast en route to a parallel world and the enchanted Balisong Caves inhabited by beautiful fairies but highly territorial are popular stories that have been passed down for generations.

Barangay Casanayan is home to the mummified corpse of Lola Bebe or Maria de Juan Basañes, a migrant from Cavite who married a town local but died from heart attack in 1929 only to be found fully intact in her grave several decades later. The cadaver is believed to be miraculous as it has healed many residents from illness and is preserved by family descendants for public viewing.

References

External links
 [ Philippine Standard Geographic Code]
Philippine Census Information

Municipalities of Capiz